Amanda Lindsey Cook (born Amanda Falk; May 8, 1984), also known as Falcon (since 2020) is a Canadian singer, songwriter, and contemporary Christian music recording artist from Niverville, Manitoba. She received a Juno Award at the 2006 awards ceremony for her eponymous debut album. Cook has released three albums under her maiden name  Amanda Falk, Beautiful, and In Between the Now & Then.

In 2010, Cook joined the Bethel Music collective, and has since released two albums under Bethel  Brave New World and House on a Hill.

Musical career
In 2004, Cook released her self-titled debut album, Amanda Falk, on Winnipeg label Avante Records. It was later released to the iTunes Store on May 30, 2006. The album received the 2006 Juno Award for the Contemporary Christian/Gospel Album of the Year.

Cook's second album Beautiful was released on October 23, 2007, on Avante Records. During this time she was also a part of the Beautiful Unique Girl Movement. Cook has also received a GMA Canada Covenant Award for Female Vocalist of the Year for four consecutive years, 2005 through 2008. On March 1, 2010, she released her third album In Between the Now & Then on the record label Signpost Music.

In 2010, Cook became a worship leader at Bethel Church in Redding, California, joining the Bethel music collective, Bethel Music. She has appeared on many Bethel Music albums since then.

On September 25, 2015, Cook released her first studio album Brave New World through Bethel Music under the new name "Amanda Lindsey Cook". The album received the Inspirational Album of the Year award at the 2016 GMA Dove Awards. On March 29, 2019, Cook released her second album under Bethel Music, House on a Hill.

In an interview to Soul Shine Magazine, she said that she is musically influenced by Sarah McLachlan, Nichole Nordeman, Norah Jones, and John Mayer.

On August 21, 2020, Cook released a single titled "I'll Admit It", as the debut single from her pop music project under the name "Falcon". Two weeks later, on September 4, 2020, Cook released her second single as Falcon, titled "Young Love", alongside a music video. On September 18, 2020, "The Good Stuff" was released as Cook's third Falcon single, with a music video. On October 13, 2020, Cook announced that Nova, her debut studio album as Falcon, would be released on October 16, 2020.

Personal life 
Cook married Jacob Cook on January 16, 2011.

Discography

Albums

Singles

As lead artist

As featured artist

Other charted songs

As lead artist

As a featured artist

Other appearances

Songs on compilations

 27th Annual Covenant Hits, "Broken" (CMC, 2006)
 28th Annual Covenant Hits, "Endless" (CMC, 2007)
 GMA Canada presents 30th Anniversary Collection, "Small" (CMC, 2008)

Awards and recognition
Gospel Music Association Canada Covenant Awards

|-
| 2005
| Herself
| Female Vocalist of the Year
| 
|-
| 2006 
| Herself
| Female Vocalist of the Year
| 
|-
| 2007 
| Herself
| Female Vocalist of the Year
| 
|-
| 2008
| Herself
| Female Vocalist of the Year
| 
|-
| 2008 
| "Beautiful" (co-written with Malynda Zacharias and Marshall Zacharias)
| Pop/Contemporary Song of the Year
| 
|-
| rowspan="3" | 2010
| Herself
| Female Vocalist of the Year
| 
|-
| In Between the Now & Then
| Pop/Contemporary Album of the Year
| 
|-
| "Song For Matthew"
| Inspirational Song of the Year
| 
|-
| rowspan="3" | 2014
| Herself
| Female Vocalist of the Year
| 
|-
| "You Make Me Brave"
| Song of the Year
| 
|-
| "You Make Me Brave"
| Praise & Worship Song of the Year
| 
|}

Juno Awards

|-
| 2006
| Amanda Falk
| Contemporary Christian/Gospel Album of the Year
| 
|-
| 2008 
| Beautiful
| Contemporary Christian/Gospel Album of the Year
| 
|-
| 2016 
| Brave New World
| Contemporary Christian/Gospel Album of the Year
| 
|}

Shai Awards (formerly The Vibe Awards)

|-
| rowspan="2"| 2005
| Herself
| New Artist of the Year
| 
|-
| Herself
| Female Vocalist of the Year
| 
|-
| 2007
| Herself
| Female Vocalist of the Year
| 
|}

Western Canadian Music Awards

|-
| 2005
| Amanda Falk
| Outstanding Christian Recording
| 
|-
| 2010 
| In Between the Now & Then
| Contemporary Christian/Gospel Recording of the Year
| 
|}

GMA Dove Awards

|-
| rowspan="2" | 2016
| Brave New World
| Inspirational Album of the Year
| 
|-
| "Pieces"
| Inspirational Song of the Year
| 
|-
| 2019
| Awakening
| Short Form Video of the Year
| 
|}

See also

 Music of Canada
 List of Canadian musicians

Notes
 Cook was also nominated for 2008 GMAC Awards in the categories of Album of the Year: Beautiful, Pop/Contemporary Album of the Year: Beautiful, and Song of the Year: "Beautiful".

References

External links
 

1984 births
Living people
Canadian performers of Christian music
Canadian Mennonites
Mennonite musicians
Musicians from Manitoba
Juno Award for Contemporary Christian/Gospel Album of the Year winners
People from Eastman Region, Manitoba
21st-century Canadian women singers